Melanodaedala is a genus of moths of the family Tortricidae.

Species
Melanodaedala diffusa (Bradley, 1957)
Melanodaedala scopulosana (Meyrick, 1881)

Former species
Melanodaedala melanoneura (Meyrick, 1912)

See also
List of Tortricidae genera

References

External links
tortricidae.com

Eucosmini
Tortricidae genera
Taxa named by Marianne Horak